Frihedslund is a manor house and estate located on the east side of Tissø, Kalundborg Municipality some  west of Copenhagen, Denmark. The estate is now owned by the Jarl Foundation and operated as an educational centre for agriculture students under the name Frihedslund Lærergård.

History

18th century
Arnoldus von Falkenskiold, a colonel, bought the manor of Sæbygaard in 1779. He turned the farm Falkenhøj into a separate manor in 1787 and in 1790 he also detached another manor which was given the name Frihedslund. When he sold Sæbygaard and instead acquired Sophienberg at Hørsholm, in 1797, he initially kept Frihedslund for a few more years.

19th century
 
In around 1800, Falkenskiold sold Frihedslund to Christian, Count Rantzau-Ascheberg, who had recently also acquired nearby Søbygaard. Both estates were shortly thereafter sold to war commissioner general Haagen Christian Astrup. 
In 1806, Astrup sold the two estates to Frederik Hoppe, who had recently sold Rosenfeldt at Vordingborg. In 1806. he also purchased Løvegård. In 1809, Hoppe sold Frihedslund to A.H. Bachmann. Bachmann's heirs sold the estate to Countess Agnethe Rosencrone who later that same year sold it again.

 
The new owner was major Harald Rothe. He had bought the estates Aggersvold at Jyderup in 1806 and Egholm at Roskilde in 1809 and had that same year been ennobled by letters patent. He was the son of Casper Peter Rothe Edle Cathrine Severine Soelberg of Urup Manior at Horsens. His wife, Wilhelmine Antoinette Fix, was a daughter of the merchant Johan Leonhard Fix.

Harald Rothe's hairs sold the estate to first lieutenant Jacob Vilhelm Saxtorph in 1850. His son, Sylvester Saxtorph, a prominent medical doctor, was born on the estate in 1851.

20th and 21st centuries
Valdemar Hvist, a son of the wealthy merchant and politician Lauritz Nicolai Hvidt, purchased Frihedslund in 1859. His widow kept the estate after his death and passed it to their son Daniel Gvidt in 1895.

In 1938, Hvidt's heirs sold Frihedslund to by Børge Strand. He later purchased 55 hectares of land from the owner of Falkenhøj. The estate was in 1965 purchased by Jarlfonden.

Estate
To the southwest of the main building is a small woodland with a lake. The land is protected.

Today
The Jarl Foundation (Jarlfonden) operates the estate as an educational centre for agricultural apprentices under the name Frihedslund Lærergård. The foundation, which was founded by the landowner and artist Axel Harl in 1949, is also the owner of Marienhøj at Ruds Vedby. The foundation is also leasing the farmland of the neighbouring estates   Selchausdal and Hallebygården with a combined area of  273 hectares and another 75 hectares of farmland at four other sites. The two estates has a combined area of approximately 360 hectares. It is also the owner of the Strødam Nature Reserve at Hillerød (160 hectares).

List of owners
 (1790-1800) Arnoldus von Falkenskiold 
 (1800-1801) Christian Rantzau-Ascheberg 
 (1800-1806) Haagen Christian Astrup 
 (1806-1809) Frederik Hoppe 
 (1809-1823) A.H. Bachmann 
 (1823-1824) Agnethe Marie Hielmstierne, gift Rosencrone 
 (1824- ) Harald Rothe 
 ( -1850) Harald Rothe 
 (1850-1860) J.V. Saxtorph 
 (1860-1878) Valdemar Hvidt 
 (1878-1895) Enke efter Valdemar Hvidt 
 (1895-1937) Daniel Hvidt 
 (1938- ) Børge Strand 
 (1965–present) Jarlfonden

See also
 Algestrup

References

Rxternal links
 Official website
 Rothe family

Manor houses in Kalundborg Municipality
1790 establishments in Denmark